Patrícia Christiane Guedes Bastos (born 18 April 1970) is a Brazilian singer-songwriter.

Biography
Born in Macapá, the daughter of singer Oneide Bastos, she began her professional music career at 18, when she was chosen as the lead vocalist of the group Banda Brinds, with whom she remained for five years. Starting from the 1990s, she embarked on a solo career, first performing locally, and later gaining national recognition through participation in several festivals.

With her following album, Batom Bacaba, she again received nominations in the Best Album and Best Singer categories at the Prêmio da Música Brasileira, and was also nominated for a Latin Grammy for Best Portuguese Language Roots Album.

Her style is characterized from references to the musical tradition of her homeland, the Amapá region, and in particular to its African and indigenous ancestries.

Discography

Studio albums
 Pólvora e Fogo (2002)
 Sobre Tudo (2007)
 Eu Sou Caboca (2009)
 Zulusa (2013)
 Batom Bacaba (2016)
 Timbres e Temperos (2021) (with Enrico di Micelli and Joãozinho Gomes)

Live albums
 Patrícia Bastos In Concert (2004)

References

External links 
 

 

1970 births
Living people
People from Macapá
Brazilian singer-songwriters 
Música Popular Brasileira singers
21st-century Brazilian singers
21st-century Brazilian women singers
Women in Latin music